Barclay Graham Plager (March 26, 1941 – February 6, 1988) was a Canadian professional ice hockey defenceman and coach for the St. Louis Blues.

Playing career
The oldest of three hockey playing brothers (with Bill and Bob), Plager played junior league hockey with the Peterborough Petes of the Ontario Hockey Association before spending six seasons in the minor leagues, cementing a reputation as a hard-nosed defensive defenceman. His reputation was established while still in juniors, when he had a notable fight with his own brother Bob, who was playing for the rival Guelph Royals. Plager spent the 1964 season with the Omaha Knights of the Central Professional Hockey League (CPHL), leading the league in assists and winning best defenceman accolades before being sold by the Detroit Red Wings to the Montreal Canadiens for $20,000. He played the majority of the next three seasons with the Springfield Indians of the AHL.

With the 1967 NHL Expansion, many new jobs opened up in the National Hockey League, and Plager was acquired with Red Berenson by the St. Louis Blues from the New York Rangers, which held his rights. The deal proved extremely successful for the Blues, for Berenson became the first great offensive star of the newly minted Western Division, while Plager anchored a stingy defence that allowed the fewest goals in the NHL in 1969, the second fewest in 1970, and the third fewest in 1971. Behind Plager's leadership—he was named the second captain in team history in 1970 and served longer than any other Blues' captain save for Brian Sutter—the Blues made the Stanley Cup finals their first three seasons. The three Plager brothers played together for four seasons in St. Louis, with Barclay and Bob together on the Blues' defence for eleven seasons, then widely seen as the "Plagers' team".

Post-NHL career
With his career winding down, Plager was named player-coach of the Blues' Kansas City CHL farm team in 1977, leading his club into the finals and being named the league's most valuable player. He retired as a player during the following season when he was named as head coach of the Blues, succeeding Leo Boivin. In his one full season as Blues' coach, 1979, however, the Blues had their worst season in franchise history, and he was relieved of duties the following season.

Suffering from dizzy spells thought to be the result of an old head injury, Plager was examined by a doctor following his stepping down as coach. He was diagnosed with a brain tumour.

On March 24, 1981, prior to a game with the New York Islanders, Barclay Plager Night was held and his No. 8 was retired.

In 1981, Plager was named assistant coach of the Blues, and save for another stint as interim head coach in the 1983 season, served as such until his death from cancer in 1988.

Death
In early 1987, Plager had an operation to remove a brain tumour with a heat treatment. He survived the operation, but when a new and rapidly growing tumour was discovered later that year, he refused treatment because he was informed that extensive brain damage might occur. He entered the hospital late in January 1988, and died on February 6, 1988, of a brain hemorrhage.

At the All-Star Game February 9, 1988, a moment of silence was held at the St. Louis Arena in his memory.

Career achievements and facts
 Retired with 44 goals, 187 assists, 231 points and 1115 penalty minutes in 614 games, all with St. Louis
 Was the Blues' career leader in games played and penalty minutes at the time of his retirement
 Played in NHL All-Star Game in 1970, 1971, 1973 and 1974
 Led the NHL in penalty minutes in 1968 with 153 playing only 49 games
 His No. 8 jersey has been retired by the St. Louis Blues

Career statistics

Regular season and playoffs

Coaching record

References

External links

1941 births
1988 deaths
Buffalo Bisons (AHL) players
Canadian ice hockey defencemen
Edmonton Flyers (WHL) players
Ice hockey people from Ontario
National Hockey League players with retired numbers
Peterborough Petes (ice hockey) players
Pittsburgh Hornets players
Quebec Aces (AHL) players
St. Louis Blues coaches
St. Louis Blues players
Springfield Indians players
Sportspeople from Kirkland Lake
Canadian ice hockey coaches